Curlytop is a 1924 American silent romantic drama film directed by Maurice Elvey and starring Shirley Mason, Wallace MacDonald, and Warner Oland. It is based on one of the short stories collected in Limehouse Nights by Thomas Burke.

Plot
As described in a review in a film magazine, big Bill Branigan (MacDonald) leaves his sweetheart Bessie (Miller) for Curlytop (Mason), whose unconscious beauty naiveté enthrall him. Shanghai Dan (Oland), who dominates a gang of Chinese crooks in the Chinatown centered on Limehouse in the East End of London, also desires her. Determined to reform, Bill sets out in search of a job, so Bessie revenges herself by getting Curlytop drunk and cutting off her golden curls. Bill returns but cannot find Curlytop, and is persuaded to rekindle his relationship with Bessie. After he finds the golden curls among her belongings, Bill forces Bessie to reveal the whereabouts of Curlytop. Curlytop has been working for Shanghai Dan as a waitress on a floating barge. As Dan is hypnotizing her, another vessel crashes into the barge. Dan is drowned while Curlytop is rescued by Bill.

Cast

Preservation
With no prints of Curlytop located in any film archives, it is a lost film.

References

Bibliography
 Solomon, Aubrey. The Fox Film Corporation, 1915-1935: A History and Filmography. McFarland, 2011.

External links
 
 
 
 

1924 films
1924 romantic drama films
1920s English-language films
American silent feature films
American romantic drama films
Films directed by Maurice Elvey
American black-and-white films
Fox Film films
Films set in London
1920s American films
Silent romantic drama films
Silent American drama films